Glaucocharis taphrophracta is a moth in the family Crambidae. It was described by Edward Meyrick in 1934. It is found in Sichuan, China.

References

Diptychophorini
Moths described in 1934